The Ice Storm is a 1997 soundtrack to the film of the same name starring Kevin Kline, Joan Allen, Sigourney Weaver, Tobey Maguire, Christina Ricci, and Elijah Wood. One of the noticeable features of The Ice Storm is its score. Most of the professional music featured in the film was independently produced 1970s-type music, as the budget was tight, requiring  most of it to be independent music. Notably, Indonesian Gamelan and Native American flute instruments were used. Lee and James Schamus wanted to have an "actual score"—not a "nostalgic film with radio music of an earlier time". The soundtrack was first released in the United States on October 21, 1997.

Track listing 
"Shoplift" – Mychael Danna
"Finale" – Mychael Danna
"I Can't Read" – David Bowie
"Light Up or Leave Me Alone" – Traffic
"Dirty Love" – Frank Zappa
"I Got a Name" – Jim Croce
"Montego Bay" – Bobby Bloom
"O Grande Amor" – Antonio Carlos Jobim
"Too Late to Turn Back Now" – Cornelius Brothers & Sister Rose
"Help Me Make It Through the Night" – Sammi Smith
"Coconut" – Harry Nilsson
"Mr. Big" – Free

Maureen McGovern's 1973 hit single "The Morning After" also appears in the film as a briefly heard instrumental piece of music performed by Wendy's school orchestra.

References

Drama film soundtracks
1997 soundtrack albums
1997 compilation albums